John Forward may refer to:

 John F. Forward Jr., American politician from California
 John F. Forward Sr., his father, American politician from California